The 1989 French Figure Skating Championships took place in Caen for singles and pairs and in Limoges for ice dance. Skaters competed in the disciplines of men's singles, women's singles, pair skating, and ice dancing on the senior level. The event was used to help determine the French team to the 1989 World Championships and the 1989 European Championships.

Results

Men

Ladies

Pairs

Ice dance

External links
 French article

1988 in figure skating
French Figure Skating Championships, 1989
French Figure Skating Championships
1989 in French sport